Kesgarh Qila or Takht Kesgarh Sahib, alternatively spelt as Keshgarh Qila, is the name given to the Takhat that the tenth Master constructed in Anandpur Sahib. The fort is the called Takhat Kesgarh Sahib. This Gurdwara was one of the forts constructed by Guru Gobind Singh at Anandpur Sahib for the defense of the Sikhs. The Guru spent 25 years at Anandpur Sahib and to protect the Sikhs from the hill Rajas or Mughals, the Guru began the construction of five defensive Qilas (forts) all around the town.

The Qilas, constructed by Guru Gobind Singh at Anandpur Sahib are:

1. Takht Kesgarh Sahib Qila at the center (now a Takhat)

2. Anandgarh Qila (fort of bliss)

3. Lohgarh Qila (fort of steel) 

4. Holgarh Qila (fort of colour)

5. Fatehgarh Qila (fort of victory)

6. Taragarh Qila (fort of stars)

All the forts were joined together with earthworks and tunnels. All Qila Situated at Anandpur Sahib. In this Qilas one Qila is now Takht of Sikhs Takht Kesgarh Sahib Qila.

History

The Takht is one of Five Takht in Sikhism, the Takht name is Takht Kesgarh sahib being the place where the last two Sikh Gurus, Guru Tegh Bahadur and Guru Gobind Singh, lived. It is also the place where Guru Gobind Singh founded the Khalsa Panth in 1699.

Jathedars of Takht Keshgarh Sahib

Gallery

References

Sikh places
Sikh architecture
Rupnagar
Forts in Punjab, India